The following is a list of North Wales Crusaders seasons:

Seasons

Notes

External links 
 Crusaders official website

Seasons
2011 establishments in Wales
Welsh rugby league seasons

cy:Croesgadwyr Rygbi'r Gynghrair
fr:Crusaders Rugby League